Fahad Usman (born September 2, 1976 in Karachi, Sindh, Pakistan) is a Pakistani-born cricketer who played for the United Arab Emirates national cricket team. He played for Pakistan national under-19 cricket team during the 1995-96 season. Fahad Usman played one first-class match for Karachi Whites in the 1997–98 Quaid-e-Azam Trophy before emigrating to the United Arab Emirates. He later continued his first-class career with one game for the UAE in the 2004 ICC Intercontinental Cup and two games in the 2005 version of the competition. His two One Day Internationals came in the 2004 Asia Cup. He also competed for his adopted nation in the 1994 ICC Six-Nations Challenge and the 2005 ICC Trophy.

References

External links

Emirati cricketers
1976 births
Living people
United Arab Emirates One Day International cricketers
Pakistani cricketers
Karachi Whites cricketers
Pakistani emigrants to the United Arab Emirates
Pakistani expatriate sportspeople in the United Arab Emirates
Cricketers from Karachi